New Inn Hall was one of the earliest medieval halls of the University of Oxford. It was located in New Inn Hall Street, Oxford.

History

Trilleck's Inn 
The original building on the site was Trilleck's Inn, a medieval hall or hostel for students, which passed on the death in 1360 of its founder Bishop John Trilleck, Bishop of Hereford to William of Wykeham, Bishop of Winchester, and from him to New College in 1392.

New Inn Hall 
After being used by Cistercian students for some years from about 1400 to 1420, the hall was entirely rebuilt shortly before 1476 and renamed the New Inn.

As the Inns developed into teaching establishments, New Inn Hall became noted for its jurists such as Alberico Gentili, Regius Professor of Civil Law, Sir Daniel Donne, the first MP for Oxford University in Parliament and Dr John Budden, Regius Professor of Civil Law.

During the First English Civil War, the university's college plate was requisitioned by the King's Oxford Parliament and taken to New Inn Hall to be melted down into "Oxford Crowns".

Part of the site was used in 1833 by John Cramer, then the principal, to build the Cramer Building as a hostel for undergraduates.

Merger with Balliol College 
Under a statute of 1881, New Inn Hall was merged into Balliol College in 1887. Balliol acquired New Inn Hall's admissions and other records for 1831–1887 as well as the library of New Inn Hall, which largely contained 18th century law books. New Inn Hall was then used to accommodate students on an Indian Civil Service probationary course.

St Peter's College 
When the site was no longer required by Balliol, it was put up for sale. The Cramer Building was sold in 1894 to Francis James Chavasse and W. Talbot Rice (rector of St Peter-le-Bailey), who converted it into a missionary centre known as Hannington Hall. In 1929, it became part of St Peter's Hall (now St Peter's College), a new college founded by Chavasse, formerly rector of St Peter-le-Bailey and later Bishop of Liverpool.

The remainder of the site was purchased by the City Council, and the buildings demolished to make room for a new Central Girls' School. The school site was subsequently purchased by St Peter's College.

Principals 
The following served as Principals of New Inn Hall:

See also 
 :Category:Alumni of New Inn Hall, Oxford

References 

Former colleges and halls of the University of Oxford
Buildings and structures of the University of Oxford